Kohiruimaki (written: 小比類巻) is a Japanese surname. Notable people with the surname include:

, Japanese singer
, Japanese kickboxer and karateka

Japanese-language surnames